William Borlase (1696–1772) was a Cornish clergyman, antiquary, geologist and naturalist.

William Borlase may also refer to:

 Sir William Borlase (died 1629) (c. 1564–1629), English politician and Member of Parliament
 William Borlase (died 1630) (c. 1588–1630), English politician and Member of Parliament
 William Borlase (died 1665) (1620–1665), English politician and Member of Parliament
 William Copeland Borlase (1848–1899), English antiquarian and Member of Parliament

See also
 Sir William Borlase's Grammar School, Buckinghamshire, England, established by the William Borlase who died in 1629